Tomopleura reciproca is a species of sea snail, a marine gastropod mollusk in the family Borsoniidae.

Description
The size of the shell attains 12 mm, its width 4 mm. The small shell is lanceolate. It contains ten slightly convex whorls bearing revolving carinae, of which there are 4–5 on the whorls of the spire, and 10–12 on the body whorl. The middle carina is stronger, the interspaces clathrate. The aperture measures one-fourth the total length. The sinus is broad and deep. The siphonal canal is short, wide and twisted.

Distribution
This marine species occurs off Japan

References

External links

reciproca
Gastropods described in 1860